Togoyo (Togoy) is an extinct Ubangian language of South Sudan.

References

Languages of South Sudan
Sere languages